Margarethe Held (born 19 March 1911, date of death unknown) was an Austrian athlete. She competed in the women's discus throw at the 1936 Summer Olympics.

References

1911 births
Year of death missing
Athletes (track and field) at the 1936 Summer Olympics
Austrian female discus throwers
Olympic athletes of Austria
Place of birth missing